The 1900 Georgia Bulldogs football team represented the Georgia Bulldogs of the University of Georgia during the 1900      Southern Intercollegiate Athletic Association football season. The Bulldogs competed as a member of the Southern Intercollegiate Athletic Association (SIAA) and completed the season with a 2–4 record; no improvement at all over the previous year's mark under coach Gordon Saussy (2–3–1).  Although the season started well with back-to-back victories, including Georgia's fourth straight victory over Georgia Tech, it ended with four consecutive losses.  In fact, Georgia was outscored 99–0 in the last two games of the season at the hands of North Carolina and Auburn.

Matters were not helped by the fact that Georgia only had three starting players return to the team from the 1899 team. One of the star players on the 1900 team was a young man who weighed only 110 pounds, but made up for his lack of size with skill, speed, agility and leadership skills.  A notable player from the 1900 season was center Harold Hirsch.  Hirsch played for Georgia during the 1900 and 1901 seasons and later became an influential attorney.  In 1932, the University of Georgia School of Law moved into a building called the Harold Hirsch Law Building, named for Hirsch.

Schedule

References

Additional sources
 Reed, Thomas Walter (1949). Athens, Georgia: University of Georgia Press. History of the University of Georgia; Chapter XVII: Athletics at the University from the Beginning Through 1947 imprint pages 3464-3465
 Harold Hirsch profile

Georgia
Georgia Bulldogs football seasons
Georgia Bulldogs football